Javier Pedro Saviola Fernández (born 11 December 1981) is an Argentine former professional footballer who played as a forward.

He represented both Barcelona and Real Madrid, also having notable spells with Benfica and Olympiacos, and was named as the youngest player on Pelé's FIFA 100 list of the 125 greatest living footballers in 2004. Due to his ancestry he also holds Spanish nationality since 2004, and he amassed La Liga totals of 196 games and 70 goals over the course of eight seasons; he started and finished his career at River Plate.

Saviola won league titles in Argentina, Spain, Portugal and Greece during his playing career, as well as a UEFA Cup. An Argentine international for seven years, he represented his country at the 2006 World Cup and the 2004 Copa América, where Argentina reached the final. He also won a gold medal at the 2004 Olympics in Athens.

Club career

River Plate
Nicknamed El Conejo (The Rabbit), Buenos Aires-born Saviola made his debut for Club Atlético River Plate at the age of 16, and went on to be a prolific goalscorer for the club.

He helped River to the 1999 Apertura and 2000 Clausura championships, and earned the 1999 South American Footballer of the Year award. Still only 18, he gained a reputation as a phenomenal prospect, and was even regarded as a potential heir to Diego Maradona, in particular after he broke the latter's 1978 record by becoming the youngest player to win the Golden Boot award.

Barcelona
In 2001, aged 19, Saviola moved abroad to play for FC Barcelona in a £15 million transfer. He obtained Spanish citizenship shortly after, thereby not being restricted by the Spanish league maximum on the number of non-European Union citizens allowed in each team; under coach Carles Rexach, he scored 17 goals in his first season, finishing joint-fourth top scorer in La Liga.

Saviola's second year at the Camp Nou did not start well, as he only scored two goals in the first half of the season. Radomir Antić became the new coach after Louis van Gaal was fired, and he went on to net 11 goals in the latter half of the campaign; Frank Rijkaard was subsequently appointed as new manager for 2003–04, and the player scored 14 times in the league alone, but was deemed surplus at the club as was longtime attacking partner Patrick Kluivert.

Saviola was sent on loan in the summer of 2004, moving to AS Monaco FC in Ligue 1. As he did not fit into Rijkaard's plans he was again loaned out the following year, this time to Sevilla FC who were seeking to replace Real Madrid-bound Júlio Baptista; with the Andalusians he won his first title in Europe, conquering the UEFA Cup — he also scored nine times in the league, good enough for fifth.

Saviola returned to Barcelona for 2006–07, playing in 18 league games, six as a starter, and netting five goals. He benefited greatly from injuries to teammates, most notably to Samuel Eto'o, and added five in as many matches in that season's Copa del Rey, notably a hat-trick against Deportivo Alavés (3–2 win at home, 5–2 aggregate).

Real Madrid
On 10 July 2007, Real Madrid signed Saviola after his Barcelona contract expired, on a three-year deal. Although on a financially lucrative contract, he endured a difficult time at Real, being mainly restricted to cup matches and sporadic appearances (mainly as a substitute) in the league and the UEFA Champions League.

The arrival of Klaas-Jan Huntelaar limited Saviola's opportunities even more, and he finished his Real Madrid spell with five goals in 28 overall appearances.

Benfica

On 26 June 2009, S.L. Benfica and Real Madrid agreed on a €5 million deal that would see Saviola play in Portugal for the next three years, with an option for one more; a €30 million clause was added. On 16 July, he scored two goals to send his team into the Guadiana Trophy finals after defeating Athletic Bilbao.

Saviola netted twice on 22 October 2009, guiding his side to a 5–0 victory over Everton for the UEFA Europa League (he would also score in their 2–0 win in Liverpool in the second match), adding another brace four days later in a 6–1 routing of C.D. Nacional for the Primeira Liga.

On 6 December 2009, Saviola scored through a chip shot against Académica de Coimbra in a 4–0 home win. On 20 December he netted the game's only goal as Benfica defeated rivals FC Porto at home; during the victorious campaign, he formed a deadly attacking partnership with Paraguayan Óscar Cardozo, with the pair combining for more than 50 goals overall.

On 3 January 2010, shortly before receiving the SJPF Player of the Month award, Saviola scored another winning goal against Nacional, now for the Taça da Liga, again being the game's only scorer in an away defeat of Rio Ave FC, netting in the 48th minute. He scored his 19th goal overall in a 3–1 home triumph against F.C. Paços de Ferreira on 7 March, and the Lisbon club was eventually crowned league champions

Málaga
In the last hours of the 2012–13 summer transfer window, Saviola agreed on a move to Málaga CF. He played 45 minutes in his first appearance, a 1–0 win at Real Zaragoza on 1 September.

On 15 September 2012, Saviola scored once and provided one assist in a 3−1 home win against Levante UD. He continued with his streak the following game, Málaga's first-ever in the Champions League group stage, netting in a 3–0 home win over FC Zenit Saint Petersburg.

Olympiacos
On 25 July 2013, Saviola signed a two-year contract with Greek champions Olympiacos FC. He scored his first goal in the Superleague on 25 August, coming on at half-time and helping his team come from behind to win 2–1 at home to Atromitos F.C. On 10 December he netted a brace – and also missed a penalty – in a 3–1 success over R.S.C. Anderlecht also at the Karaiskakis Stadium in the group stage's last round, which helped the Piraeus team finish second and qualify at the expense of former side Benfica.

Verona
On 2 September 2014, Saviola joined Serie A club Hellas Verona FC. He made his official debut on 22 September, starting in a 2–2 home draw against Genoa CFC, and scored his first goal on 2 December, netting the only in a home win over Perugia Calcio for the Coppa Italia. His sole goal of the league season came on 25 January 2015, the only one in a home victory over Atalanta BC.

Return to River
On 30 June 2015, River Plate announced that Saviola had returned to the club. He left in January of the following year, after failing to find the net in his second spell, and subsequently retired from professional football at the age of 34.

Retirement, coaching, and futsal career
Immediately after retiring, Saviola settled in Andorra with his family and was appointed assistant manager at FC Ordino in the Primera Divisió. In February 2018, he joined local futsal team Encamp. In April of that year, he won the principality's futsal league with the side.

International career

Saviola starred in the 2001 edition of the FIFA U-20 World Cup, held in Argentina. He was top scorer and was voted player of the tournament, as the national team won the competition; with 11 goals in seven games, he became the record goal-scorer in the tournament's history.

Two years later, Saviola played in the 2004 Olympic Games and won the gold medal. Under coach Marcelo Bielsa he was given few playing opportunities for the senior team but, after the former's resignation in 2004, new manager José Pékerman, who also worked with him at youth level, turned the tide in the player's favour; he was also a member of the squads that reached final of the 2004 Copa América and the 2005 FIFA Confederations Cup, netting three times in the former tournament and one in the latter.

Saviola was called up to represent Argentina at the 2006 World Cup – Luciano Figueroa and Luciano Galletti were also in contention for a place on the roster, but his excellent form for Sevilla secured his place in the squad. He scored against Ivory Coast in the country's opening game, and made two assists in the 6–0 victory over Serbia and Montenegro also in the group phase.

Saviola retired from international football on 5 December 2009, although not yet 28. He stated that he felt his career as an Argentina player had come to an end, and that he wanted to concentrate on club football.

Style of play
Saviola was known for his speed, agility, dribbling and ability to score from almost any attacking position on the field. A diminutive, talented, and prolific forward, with a slender build, he was capable of playing as a striker, in a more creative role as a second striker, or even in a playmaking role as an attacking midfielder. Throughout his career, Saviola was nicknamed El Conejo (The Rabbit, in Spanish), due to his appearance, and also El Pibito (The Little Kid, in Spanish), a reference to compatriot Diego Maradona, who was nicknamed El Pibe de Oro (The Golden Kid, in Spanish), and to whom Saviola was often compared in his youth.

Media
Saviola was sponsored by sportswear company Nike, and appeared in commercials for the brand. In a global advertising campaign in the run-up to the 2002 World Cup in Korea and Japan, he starred in a "Secret Tournament" commercial (branded "Scopion KO") directed by Terry Gilliam, appearing alongside footballers such as Luís Figo, Thierry Henry, Hidetoshi Nakata, Roberto Carlos, Ronaldinho, Ronaldo and Francesco Totti, with former player Eric Cantona the tournament "referee".

Career statistics

Club

International

Scores and results list Argentina's goal tally first, score column indicates score after each Saviola goal.

Honours
River Plate
Argentine Primera División: 1999 Apertura, 2000 Clausura
Copa Libertadores: 2015
Suruga Bank Championship: 2015
FIFA Club World Cup runner-up: 2015

Sevilla
UEFA Cup: 2005–06

Real Madrid
La Liga: 2007–08
Supercopa de España: 2008

Benfica
Primeira Liga: 2009–10
Taça da Liga: 2009–10, 2010–11, 2011–12
Supertaça Cândido de Oliveira runner-up: 2010

Olympiacos
Super League Greece: 2013–14

Argentina
FIFA U-20 World Cup: 2001
Summer Olympic Games: 2004
Copa América runner-up: 2004
FIFA Confederations Cup runner-up: 2005

Individual
Argentine Primera División: 1999 Apertura Top scorer
South American Footballer of the Year: 1999
South American Team of the Year: 1999
Player of the Year of Argentina: 1999
FIFA World Youth Championship: Golden Shoe 2001
FIFA World Youth Championship: Golden Ball 2001
Trofeo EFE: 2001–02
Primeira Liga: Player of the Month December 2009
Portuguese Golden Ball: 2010
FIFA 100

References

External links

 
 
 
 

1981 births
Living people
Footballers from Buenos Aires
Argentine footballers
Argentine men's futsal players
Association football forwards
Club Atlético River Plate footballers
FC Barcelona players
AS Monaco FC players
Sevilla FC players
UEFA Cup winning players
Real Madrid CF players
S.L. Benfica footballers
Málaga CF players
Olympiacos F.C. players
Hellas Verona F.C. players
FC Encamp players
Argentine Primera División players
La Liga players
Ligue 1 players
Primeira Liga players
Super League Greece players
Serie A players
Argentina under-20 international footballers
Olympic footballers of Argentina
Argentina international footballers
2004 Copa América players
Footballers at the 2004 Summer Olympics
2005 FIFA Confederations Cup players
2006 FIFA World Cup players
Medalists at the 2004 Summer Olympics
Olympic medalists in football
Olympic gold medalists for Argentina
South American Footballer of the Year winners
FIFA 100
Argentine expatriate footballers
Argentine expatriate sportspeople in Spain
Argentine expatriate sportspeople in Monaco
Argentine expatriate sportspeople in Portugal
Argentine expatriate sportspeople in Greece
Argentine expatriate sportspeople in Italy
Argentine expatriate sportspeople in Andorra
Expatriate footballers in Spain
Expatriate footballers in Monaco
Expatriate footballers in Portugal
Expatriate footballers in Greece
Expatriate footballers in Italy
Expatriate footballers in Andorra
Naturalised citizens of Spain